The fuel economy in aircraft is the measure of the transport energy efficiency of aircraft.

Efficiency is increased with better aerodynamics and by reducing weight, and with improved engine BSFC and propulsive efficiency or TSFC.

Endurance and range can be maximized with the optimum airspeed, and economy is better at optimum altitudes, usually higher. An airline efficiency depends on its fleet fuel burn, seating density, air cargo and passenger load factor, while operational procedures like maintenance and routing can save fuel.

Average fuel burn of new aircraft fell 45% from 1968 to 2014, a compounded annual reduction 1.3% with a variable reduction rate.
In 2018, CO₂ emissions totalled 747 million tonnes for passenger transport, for 8.5 trillion revenue passenger kilometres (RPK), giving an average of 88 gram CO₂ per RPK. A 88 gCO₂/km represents  g of fuel per km, or a  fuel consumption.

New technology can reduce engine fuel consumption, like higher pressure and bypass ratios, geared turbofans, open rotors, hybrid electric or fully electric propulsion; and airframe efficiency with retrofits, better materials and systems and  advanced aerodynamics.

Flight efficiency theory 

A powered aircraft counters its weight through aerodynamic lift and counters its aerodynamic drag with thrust. The aircraft's maximum range is determined by the level of efficiency with which thrust can be applied to overcome the aerodynamic drag.

Aerodynamics 

A subfield of fluid dynamics, aerodynamics studies the physics of a body moving through the air. As lift and drag are functions of air speed, their relationships are major determinants of an aircraft's design efficiency.

Aircraft efficiency is augmented by maximizing lift-to-drag ratio, which is attained by minimizing parasitic drag and lift-generated induced drag, the two components of aerodynamic drag. As parasitic drag increases and induced drag decreases with speed, there is an optimum speed where the sum of both is minimal; this is the best glide ratio. For powered aircraft, the optimum glide ratio has to be balanced with thrust efficiency.

Parasitic drag is constituted by form drag and skin-friction drag, and grows with the square of the speed in the drag equation. The form drag is minimized by having the smallest frontal area and by streamlining the aircraft for a low drag coefficient, while skin friction is proportional to the body's surface area and can be reduced by maximizing laminar flow.

Induced drag can be reduced by decreasing the size of the airframe, fuel and payload weight, and by increasing the wing aspect ratio or by using wingtip devices at the cost of increased structure weight.

Design speed 
By increasing efficiency, a lower cruise-speed augments the range and reduces the environmental impact of aviation; however, a higher cruise-speed allows more revenue passenger miles flown per day.

For supersonic flight, drag increases at Mach 1.0 but decreases again after the transition. With a specifically designed aircraft, such as the (in development) Aerion AS2, the Mach 1.1 range at 3,700 nmi is % of the maximum range of 5,300 nmi at Mach 0.95, but increases to 4,750 nmi at Mach 1.4 for % before falling again.

Wingtip devices 
Wingtip devices increase the effective wing aspect ratio, lowering lift-induced drag caused by wingtip vortices and improving the lift-to-drag ratio without increasing the wingspan. (Wingspan is limited by the available width in the ICAO Aerodrome Reference Code.) Airbus installed wingtip fences on its planes since the A310-300 in 1985, and Sharklet blended-winglets for the A320 were launched during the November 2009 Dubai Airshow.

Weight 

As the weight indirectly generates lift-induced drag, its minimization leads to better aircraft efficiency. For a given payload, a lighter airframe generates a lower drag. Minimizing weight can be achieved through the airframe's configuration, materials science and construction methods. To obtain a longer range, a larger fuel fraction of the maximum takeoff weight is needed, adversely affecting efficiency.

The deadweight of the airframe and fuel is non-payload that must be lifted to altitude and kept aloft, contributing to fuel consumption. A reduction in airframe weight enables the use of smaller, lighter engines. The weight savings in both allow for a lighter fuel load for a given range and payload. A rule-of-thumb is that a reduction in fuel consumption of about 0.75% results from each 1% reduction in weight.

The payload fraction of modern twin-aisle aircraft is 18.4% to 20.8% of their maximum take-off weight, while single-aisle airliners are between 24.9% and 27.7%. An aircraft weight can be reduced with light-weight materials such as titanium, carbon fiber and other composite plastics if the expense can be recouped over the aircraft's lifetime. Fuel efficiency gains reduce the fuel carried, reducing the take-off weight for a positive feedback. For example, the Airbus A350 design includes a majority of light-weight composite materials. The Boeing 787 Dreamliner was the first airliner with a mostly composite airframe.

Flight distance 
For long-haul flights, the airplane needs to carry additional fuel, leading to higher fuel consumption. Above a certain distance it becomes more fuel-efficient to make a halfway stop to refuel, despite the energy losses in descent and climb. It is more fuel-efficient to make a non-stop flight at less than this distance and to make a stop when covering a greater total distance.

Very long non-stop passenger flights suffer from the weight penalty of the extra fuel required, which means limiting the number of available seats to compensate. For such flights, the critical fiscal factor is the quantity of fuel burnt per seat-nautical mile. For these reasons, the world's longest commercial flights were cancelled . An example is Singapore Airlines' former New York to Singapore flight, which could carry only 100 passengers (all business class) on the  flight. According to an industry analyst, "It [was] pretty much a fuel tanker in the air." Singapore Airlines Flights 21 and 22 were re-launched in 2018 with more seats in an A350-900ULR.

In the late 2000s/early 2010s, rising fuel prices coupled with the Great Recession caused the cancellation of many ultra-long haul, non-stop flights. This included the services provided by Singapore Airlines from Singapore to both Newark and Los Angeles that was ended in late 2013. But as fuel prices have since decreased and more fuel-efficient aircraft have come into service, many ultra-long-haul routes have been reinstated or newly scheduled (see Longest flights).

Propulsive efficiency 

The efficiency can be defined as the amount of energy imparted to the plane per unit of energy in the fuel. The rate at which energy is imparted equals thrust multiplied by airspeed.

To get thrust, an aircraft engine is either a shaft engine – piston engine or turboprop, with its efficiency inversely proportional to its brake-specific fuel consumption – coupled with a propeller having its own propulsive efficiency; or a jet engine with its efficiency given by its airspeed divided by the thrust-specific fuel consumption and the specific energy of the fuel.

Turboprops have an optimum speed below . This is less than jets used by major airlines today, however propeller planes are much more efficient. The Bombardier Dash 8 Q400 turboprop is used for this reason as a regional airliner.

Jet fuel cost and emissions reduction have renewed interest in the propfan concept for jetliners with an emphasis on engine/airframe efficiency that might come into service beyond the Boeing 787 and Airbus A350XWB. For instance, Airbus has patented aircraft designs with twin rear-mounted counter-rotating propfans. Propfans bridge the gap between turboprops, losing efficiency beyond Mach 0.5-0.6, and high-bypass turbofans, more efficient beyond Mach 0.8. NASA has conducted an Advanced Turboprop Project (ATP), where they researched a variable-pitch propfan that produced less noise and achieved high speeds.

Operations 

or   g of fuel per km, generating  g CO₂ / RPK of emissions.

Seating classes
In 2013, the World Bank evaluated the business class carbon footprint as 3.04 times higher than economy class in wide-body aircraft, and first class 9.28 times higher, due to premium seating taking more space, lower weight factors, and larger baggage allowances (assuming Load Factors of 80% for Economy Class, 60% for Business Class, and 40% for First Class).

Speed 
At constant propulsive efficiency, the maximum range speed is when the ratio between velocity and drag is minimal, while maximum endurance is attained at the best lift-to-drag ratio.

Altitude 
Air density decreases with altitude, thus lowering drag, assuming the aircraft maintains a constant equivalent airspeed. However, air pressure and temperature both decrease with altitude, causing the maximum power or thrust of aircraft engines to reduce. To minimize fuel consumption, an aircraft should cruise close to the maximum altitude at which it can generate sufficient lift to maintain its altitude. As the aircraft's weight decreases throughout the flight, due to fuel burn, its optimum cruising altitude increases.

In a piston engine, the decrease in pressure at higher altitudes can be mitigated by the installation of a turbocharger.

Decreasing temperature at higher altitudes increases thermal efficiency.

Airlines 

Since early 2006 until 2008, Scandinavian airlines (SAS) was flying slower, from 860 to 780 km/h, to save on fuel costs and curb emissions of carbon dioxide.

From 2010 to 2012, the most fuel-efficient US domestic airline was Alaska Airlines, due partly to its regional affiliate Horizon Air flying turboprops.
In 2014, MSCI ranked Ryanair as the lowest-emissions-intensity airline in its ACWI index with 75 g -e/revenue passenger kilometre – below Easyjet at 82 g, the average at 123 g and Lufthansa at 132 g – by using high-density 189-seat Boeing 737-800s.

In 2016, over the transpacific routes, the average fuel consumption was 31 pax-km per L ( per passenger). The most fuel-efficient were Hainan Airlines and ANA with 36 pax-km/L ( per passenger) while Qantas was the least efficient at 22 pax-km/L ( per passenger).
Key drivers for efficiency were the air freight share for 48%, seating density for 24%, aircraft fuel burn for 16% and passenger load factor for 12%.
That same year, Cathay Pacific and Cathay Dragon consumed 4,571,000 tonnes of fuel to transport 123,478 million revenue passenger kilometers, or 37 g/RPK, 25% better than in 1998: .

Fuel economy in air transport comes from the fuel efficiency of the aircraft + engine model, combined with airline efficiency: seating configuration, passenger load factor and air cargo. Over the transatlantic route, the most-active intercontinental market, the average fuel consumption in 2017 was 34 pax-km per L ( per passenger). The most fuel-efficient airline was Norwegian Air Shuttle with 44 pax-km/L ( per passenger), thanks to its fuel-efficient Boeing 787-8, a high 85% passenger load factor and a high density of 1.36 seat/m2 due to a low 9% premium seating. On the other side, the least efficient was British Airways at 27 pax-km/L ( per passenger), using fuel-inefficient Boeing 747-400s with a low density of 0.75 seat/m2 due to a high 25% premium seating, in spite of a high 82% load factor.

In 2018, CO₂ emissions totalled 918 Mt with passenger transport accounting for 81% or  Mt, for 8.2 trillion revenue passenger kilometres: an average fuel economy of  g/RPK CO₂ -  g/km of fuel  ( per passenger)

Procedures 

Continuous Descent Approaches can reduce emissions.
Beyond single-engine taxi, electric taxiing could allow taxiing on APU power alone, with the main engines shut down, to lower the fuel burn.

Yield management allows the optimization of the load factor, benefiting the fuel efficiency, as is the air traffic management optimization.

By taking advantage of wake updraft like migrating birds (biomimicry), Airbus believes an aircraft can save 5-10% of fuel by flying in formation,  behind the preceding one.
After A380s tests showing 12% savings, test flights were scheduled for 2020 with two A350s, before transatlantic flight trials with airlines in 2021.
Certification for shorter separation is enabled by ADS-B in oceanic airspace, and the only modification required would be flight control systems software.
Comfort would not be affected and trials are limited to two aircraft to reduce complexity but the concept could be expanded to include more.
Commercial operations could begin in 2025 with airline schedule adjustments, and other manufacturers’ aircraft could be included.

While routes are up to 10% longer than necessary, modernized air traffic control systems using ADS-B technology like the FAA NEXTGEN or European SESAR could allow more direct routing, but there is resistance from air traffic controllers.

History

Past 

Modern jet aircraft have twice the fuel efficiency of the earliest jet airliners. Late 1950s piston airliners like the Lockheed L-1049 Super Constellation and DC-7 were 1% to 28% more energy-intensive than 1990s jet airliners which cruise 40 to 80% faster. The early jet airliners were designed at a time when air crew labor costs were higher relative to fuel costs. Despite the high fuel consumption, because fuel was inexpensive in that era the higher speed resulted in favorable economical returns since crew costs and amortization of capital investment in the aircraft could be spread over more seat-miles flown per day.
Productivity including speed went from around 150 ASK/MJ*km/h for the 1930s DC-3 to 550 for the L-1049 in the 1950s, and from 200 for the DH-106 Comet 3 to 900 for the 1990s B737-800.

Today's turboprop airliners have better fuel-efficiency than current jet airliners, in part because of their propellers and turbines that are more efficient than those of the 1950s-era piston-powered airliners. 
In 2012, turboprop airliner usage was correlated with US regional carriers fuel efficiency.

Jet airliners have become 70% more fuel efficient between 1967 and 2007.
Jetliner fuel efficiency improves continuously, 40% of the improvement come from engines and 30% from airframes.
Efficiency gains were larger early in the jet age than later, with a 55-67% gain from 1960 to 1980 and a 20-26% gain from 1980 to 2000.
Average fuel burn of new aircraft fell 45% from 1968 to 2014, a compounded annual reduction 1.3% with variable reduction rate.

Concorde, a supersonic transport, managed about 17 passenger-miles to the Imperial gallon, which is 16.7 L/100 km per passenger; similar to a business jet, but much worse than a subsonic turbofan aircraft. Airbus states a fuel rate consumption of their A380 at less than 3 L/100 km per passenger (78 passenger-miles per US gallon).

Newer aircraft like the Boeing 787 Dreamliner, Airbus A350 and Bombardier CSeries, are 20% more fuel efficient per passenger kilometre than previous generation aircraft. For the 787, this is achieved through more fuel-efficient engines and lighter composite material airframes, and also through more aerodynamic shapes, winglets, more advanced computer systems for optimising routes and aircraft loading.
A life-cycle assessment based on the Boeing 787 shows a 20% emission savings compared to conventional aluminium airliners, 14-15% fleet-wide when encompassing a fleet penetration below 100%, while the air travel demand would increase due to lower operating costs.

Airbus airliners delivered in 2019 had a carbon intensity of 66.6 g of CO2e per passenger-kilometre, improving to 63.5g in 2020.

Example values 
The aviation fuel density used is 6.7 lb/USgal or 0.8 kg/L.

Commuter flights 
For flights of :

Regional flights 
For flights of

Short-haul flights
For flights of :

Medium-haul flights 
Washington Dulles – Seattle-Tacoma is 2,000 nmi) to short transatlantic flights (e.g. New York JFK – London-Heathrow is 3,000 nmi).

Long-haul flights 
Hong Kong – San Francisco International is 6,000 nmi).

While this shows the capabilities of the vehicles, the load factors (percentage of seats occupied) may differ between personal use (commonly just the driver in the car) and societal averages for long-distance auto use, and among those of particular airlines.

General aviation 
For private aircraft in general aviation, current FAI Aeroplane Efficiency records are :
 33.92 km/kg fuel or  L/100 km in a Aeroprakt-40 two seater for 300– 500 kg MTOW airplanes (C-1a class) ( L/100 km per seat).
 37.22 km/kg fuel or  L/100 km in a Monnett Sonerai single-seat racer for 500-1,000 kg MTOW airplanes(C-1b class)
 9.19 km/kg or  L/100 km in a four-seat diesel-powered Cessna 182 for 1,000-1,750 kg MTOW airplanes (C-1c class) ( L/100 km per seat).
 3.08 km/kg or  L/100 km in a Cirrus SF50 seven-seat jet for 1.75-3 t MTOW airplanes (C-1d class) ( L/100 km per seat).

Business aircraft

Future 

NASA and Boeing flight-tested a  blended wing body (BWB) X-48B demonstrator from August 2012 to April 2013. This design provides greater fuel efficiency, since the whole craft produces lift, not just the wings. The BWB concept offers advantages in structural, aerodynamic and operating efficiencies over today's more-conventional fuselage-and-wing designs. These features translate into greater range, fuel economy, reliability and life-cycle savings, as well as lower manufacturing costs. NASA has created a cruise efficient STOL (CESTOL) concept.

Fraunhofer Institute for Manufacturing Engineering and Applied Materials Research (IFAM) have researched a sharkskin-imitating paint that would reduce drag through a riblet effect. Aviation is a major potential application for new technologies such as aluminium metal foam and nanotechnology.

The International Air Transport Association (IATA) technology roadmap envisions improvements in aircraft configuration and aerodynamics. It projects the following reductions in engine fuel consumption, compared to baseline aircraft in service in 2015:
 10-15% from higher pressure and bypass ratios, lighter materials, implemented in 2010–2019 
 20-25% from high pressure core + ultra-high by-pass ratio geared turbofan, from ~2020-25
 30% from Open rotors, from ~2030
 40-80% from Hybrid electric propulsion (depending on battery use), from ~2030-40
 up to 100% due to Fully electric propulsion (primary energy from renewable source), from ~2035-40.

Moreover, it projects the following gains for aircraft design technologies:
 6 to 12% from airframe retrofits (winglets, riblets, lightweight cabin furnishing) currently available
 4 to 10% from materials and Structure (composite structure, adjustable landing gear, fly-by-wire) also currently available
 1 to 4% from electric taxiing from 2020+ 
 5 to 15% from advanced aerodynamics (hybrid/natural laminar flow, variable camber, spiroid wingtip) from 2020–25
 30% from strut-braced wings (with advanced turbofan engines, ~2030-35) 
 35% from a double bubble fuselage like the Aurora D8 (with advanced turbofan engines, ~2035) 
 30-35% from a box/joined closed wing (with advanced turbofan engines, ~2035-40)
 27 to 50% from a blended wing body design (with hybrid propulsion, ~2040)
 Up to 100% with fully electric aircraft (short range, ~2035-45)

Today's tube-and-wing configuration could remain in use until the 2030s due to drag reductions from active flutter suppression for slender flexible-wings and natural and hybrid laminar flow.
Large, ultra high bypass engines will need upswept gull wings or overwing nacelles as Pratt & Whitney continue to develop its geared turbofan to save a projected 10–15% of fuel costs by the mid-2020s.
NASA indicates this configuration could gain up to 45% with advanced aerodynamics, structures and geared turbofans, but longer term suggests savings of up to 50% by 2025 and 60% by 2030 with new ultra-efficient configurations and propulsion architectures: hybrid wing body, truss-braced wing, lifting body designs, embedded engines, and boundary-layer ingestion.
By 2030 hybrid-electric architectures may be ready for 100 seaters and distributed propulsion with tighter integration of airframe may enable further efficiency and emissions improvements.

Research projects such as Boeing's ecoDemonstrator program have sought to identify ways of improving the fuel economy of commercial aircraft operations. The U.S. government has encouraged such research through grant programs, including the FAA's Continuous Lower Energy, Emissions and Noise (CLEEN) program, and NASA's Environmentally Responsible Aviation (ERA) Project.

Multiple concepts are projected to reduce fuel consumption:
 the Airbus/Rolls-Royce E-Thrust is a hybrid electric with a gas turbine engine and electric ducted fans with energy storage allowing peak power for takeoff and climb while for the descent the engine is shut down and the fans recover energy to recharge the batteries;
 Empirical Systems Aerospace (ESAero) is developing the 150-seat ECO-150 concept for turboelectric distributed propulsion with two turboshaft engines mounted on the wing and driving generators powering ducted fans embedded in the inboard wing sections, effectively increasing the bypass ratio and propulsive efficiency for 20–30% fuel savings over the Boeing 737 NG, while providing some powered lift;
 NASA's single-aisle turbo-electric aircraft with an aft boundary layer propulsor (STARC-ABL) is a conventional tube-and-wing 737-sized airliner with an aft-mounted electric fan ingesting the fuselage boundary layer hybrid-electric propulsion, with 5.4 MW of power distributed to three electric motors: the design will be evaluated by Aurora Flight Sciences;
 The Boeing blended wing body (BWB) with a wide fuselage mated to high-aspect-ratio wings is more aerodynamically efficient because the entire aircraft contributes to the lift and it has less surface area, producing less drag and offering weight savings due to lower wing loading, while noise is shielded by locating the engines on the aft upper surface;
 Developed with the U.S. Air Force Research Laboratory and refined with NASA, the Lockheed Martin Hybrid Wing Body (HWB) combines a blended forward fuselage and wing with a conventional aft fuselage and T-tail for compatibility with existing infrastructure and airdrop; the engines in overwing nacelles on struts over the trailing edge enable higher-bypass-ratio engines with 5% less drag, provide acoustic shielding and increases lift without a thrust or drag penalty at low speed;
 Airbus-backed German Bauhaus-Luftfahrt designed the Propulsive Fuselage concept, reducing drag with a fan in the tail ingesting air flowing over the fuselage via an annular (ring-shaped) inlet and re-energizes the wake, driven with a gearbox or as a turbo-electric configuration;
 Conceived by the Massachusetts Institute of Technology for NASA, Aurora Flight Sciences developed the "double-bubble" D8, a 180-seat aircraft with a wide lifting fuselage, twin-aisle cabin to replace A320 and B737 narrowbodies, and boundary-layer ingestion with engines in the tail driving distortion-tolerant fans for a 49% fuel-burn reduction over the B737NG;
 The Boeing truss-braced wing (TBW) concept was developed for the NASA-funded Subsonic Ultra Green Aircraft Research program with an aspect ratio of 19.5 compared to 11 for the Boeing 787: the strut relieves some bending moment and a braced wing can be lighter than a cantilevered wing or longer for the same weight, having better lift-to-drag ratio by lowering the induced drag and thinner, facilitating natural laminar flow and reducing wave drag at transonic speeds;
 Dzyne Technologies reduces the thickness of the blended wing body for a 110–130-seat super-regional, a configuration usually too thick for a narrowbody replacement and better suited for large aircraft, by placing the landing gear outward and storing baggage in the wing roots, enabling 20% fuel savings;
 the French research agency ONERA designed two concepts for a 180-seat airliner Versatile Aircraft (NOVA) including turbofans with higher bypass ratios and fan diameter: a gull wing with increased dihedral inboard to accommodate larger geared turbofans under without lengthening the gear and the other with engines embedded in the tail to ingest the low-energy fuselage boundary layer flow and re-energize the wake to reduce drag;
 with Cranfield University, Rolls-Royce developed the Distributed Open Rotor (DORA) with high-aspect-ratio wing and V-tail to minimize drag, and turbogenerators on the wing driving electric propellers along the inboard leading edge with open rotor high-propulsive efficiency and increasing the effective bypass ratio.

Climate change 

The growth of air travel outpaces its fuel-economy improvements and corresponding  emissions, compromising climate sustainability. Although low-cost carriers' higher seat-density increases fuel economy and lowers greenhouse gas emissions per-passenger-kilometer, the lower airfares cause a rebound effect of more flights and larger overall emissions.

See also
 Energy efficiency in transport
Range (aeronautics)

References

External links
 
 
 
 
 
 
 
 

Aircraft operations
Energy economics
Aviation and the environment